The Men's tournament of the Volleyball competition of the 2011 Pacific Games was held on August 29–September 9, 2011.

Participating teams

Preliminary round

Group A

|}

|}

Group B

|}

|}

Knockout stage

Semifinals 

|}

Seventh place game 

|}

Fifth place game 

|}

Bronze medal match 

|}

Gold medal match 

|}

See also
Women's Volleyball at the 2011 Pacific Games

External links
Group A table
Group B table
Knockout stage table

Pacific Games Men
Volleyball at the 2011 Pacific Games